is a Japanese soccer player who plays as a striker or midfielder. In 2015, he got the Golden boot (Top Goal Scorer) in the Philippines.

Career

C.A. Las Palmas
Noda was born in Kumamoto, Japan. He played for Club Atlético Las Palmas in Argentina. After the season, joined a training for Instituto Atlético Central Córdoba and he has played and lived with Paulo Dybala.

Swan United
After joined tryouts in the US, Noda signed for Swan United in the Football West in Australia as a semi-professional. Noda usually played in central midfield and scored five goals this season.

Manila All Japan FC and JP Voltes
Noda played in his hometown and he finally signed with Manila All-Japan F.C. as a professional football player in 2014. He played 25 matches, scored 12 goals in the season.

In January 2015, Manila All-Japan F.C. changed their name for JP Voltes F.C. Noda played as a striker from this season then scored 18 goals and got the Golden Boot in the regular season. The promotion play-offs against Team Socceroo FC, he scored five goals and JP Voltes F.C. won over to promote for Division 1.

Toronto Skillz FC
In Mar 2017, Noda announced on his blogs that he signed a contract with Toronto Skillz FC which belongs to League1 Ontario, 3rd division in Canada.

Royal Toronto FC
In June 2017, Noda transferred from Toronto Skillz FC to Royal Toronto FC which belongs to Canadian Soccer League in Canada.

Portugal AC
2018 played in the Arena Premier League for Portugal AC.

Humber Hawks
In the Autumn 2018, he went to study at Humber College and played for the soccer team.

Honours
Individual
2015 United Football League Golden Boot

References

Links 
 Chihiro Noda PV 2015
 Chihiro Noda Top 10 Goals
 Chihiro Noda 2014 season PV

1988 births
Living people
People from Kumamoto
Japanese footballers
Association football forwards
Association football midfielders
JPV Marikina F.C. players
Toronto Skillz FC players
Japanese expatriate footballers
Japanese expatriate sportspeople in Argentina
Expatriate footballers in Argentina
Japanese expatriate sportspeople in Australia
Expatriate soccer players in Australia
Japanese expatriate sportspeople in the Philippines
Expatriate footballers in the Philippines
Japanese expatriate sportspeople in Canada
Expatriate soccer players in Canada